Sword Art Online is a Japanese light novel series written by Reki Kawahara with accompanying illustrations drawn by abec. The series takes place in the near-future and focuses on various virtual reality MMORPG worlds. Originally self-published online under the pseudonym Fumio Kunori, ASCII Media Works began publishing the novels on April 10, 2009 under their Dengeki Bunko imprint. The series has since grown to 27 volumes as of October 7, 2022. Yen Press began publishing the novels in English in North America and the United Kingdom with the first volume on April 22, 2014. With more than 30 million copies in print worldwide, the novels are also published in China, Taiwan, South Korea, Thailand, Brazil, Russia, Germany, Poland, Austria, France, Switzerland and Italy.

Kawahara also began writing a parallel series of light novels titled Sword Art Online: Progressive, a spin-off that focuses on the clearing of Aincrad, unlike the Aincrad stories of the main series. The first volume was released on October 10, 2012. As of June 10, 2021, eight volumes have been published as part of the Progressive series.

In addition to the original storyline of Sword Art Online and Sword Art Online: Progressive, Kawahara has also written and published Sword Art Online side stories. These side stories have been posted on his website, in a collection of side stories in Accel World, have been sold at Comitia, Dengeki Bunko's Fair and have come along with the limited edition Blu-Ray/DVD Sword Art Online compilation volumes. Before Sword Art Online was published, Kawahara had posted Sword Art Online novels on his website and there are still a few side stories on Sword Art Online, although the original novels have been removed. In addition, Kawahara has published a side story of Sword Art Online in one of his other works, Accel World. In the tenth volume of Accel World, there is a chapter where it depicts a cross over between Sword Art Online and Accel World. Several of the side stories that he has released are in a collection called the Sword Art Online Material Edition, sold at the Comitia dōjinshi-selling event, which range from novels to manga. However, all of the art in the Material Edition is drawn by Kawahara himself.

Aside from the light novels written by Kawahara, there are also two spin-offs written by other authors with supervision by him. The first one is Sword Art Online Alternative Gun Gale Online series written by Keiichi Sigsawa and illustrated by Kouhaku Kuroboshi, while the other is Sword Art Online Alternative Clover's Regret, written by Watase Souichirou and illustrated by Ginta. While both of these series take place in the same world as the main series written by Kawahara, they each feature different characters as the focus compared to the main series.

Volume list

Sword Art Online

Sword Art Online: Progressive

Sword Art Online Alternative Gun Gale Online

Sword Art Online Alternative Clover's Regret

Sword Art Online Material Edition

Sword Art Online Material Edition collections

Sword Art Online side stories

References

Lists of light novels
L